Paris-Sorbonne University (also known as Paris IV) was a public research university in Paris, France, active from 1971 to 2017. It was the main inheritor of the Faculty of Humanities of the University of Paris. In 2018, it merged with Pierre and Marie Curie University and some smaller entities to form a new university called Sorbonne University.

Paris-Sorbonne University was consistently ranked as France's as well as one of the world's most prominent universities in the humanities. QS World University Rankings ranked it 13th in humanities internationally in 2010, and 17th in 2011 and 2012. Times Higher Education World University Rankings also ranked it as France's most reputable institution of higher education in 2012.

History

Paris-Sorbonne University was one of the inheritors of the Faculty of Humanities of the University of Paris (also known as the Sorbonne), which ceased to exist following student protests in May 1968. The Faculty of Humanities was the main focus of the University of Paris, and subsequently Paris-Sorbonne University was one of its main successors. It was a member of the Sorbonne University Group.

Paris-Sorbonne University enrolled about 24,000 students in 20 departments specialising in arts, humanities and languages, divided in 12 campuses throughout Paris. In addition, the university also maintained one campus in Abu Dhabi, United Arab Emirates, alter called Sorbonne University Abu Dhabi. Paris-Sorbonne University maintained about 400 international agreements.

As a successor of the faculty of humanities of the University of Paris, it was a founding member the Sorbonne University group, an alliance with the successor of the faculty of law and economics and of the faculty of science of the University of Paris (respectively, Panthéon-Assas University and Pierre-and-Marie-Curie University). This group allowed Paris-Sorbonne University students to pursue several dual degrees. Two graduate certificates in law from Panthéon-Assas University (Sorbonne Law School) were accessible for all the student members of the Sorbonne University group.

Succession: Sorbonne University

On 1 January 2018, Paris-Sorbonne University merged with Pierre-and-Marie-Curie University to create the Sorbonne University.

Notable people

Notable faculty and staff

Notable Paris-Sorbonne university faculty include:
 Dominique Barbéris, novelist, French literature
 Yves-Marie Bercé, historian, member of the Académie des sciences morales et politiques (2007)
 Philippe Contamine, historian, member of the Académie des inscriptions et belles-lettres
 Denis Crouzet, historian, awarded the Madeleine Laurain-Portemer prize by the Académie des Sciences Morales et Politiques
 Marc Fumaroli, member of the Académie française, professor at the Collège de France
 Jean Favier (1932–2014), historian, member of the Académie des Inscriptions et Belles-Lettres
 Nicolas Grimal, egyptologist, member of the Académie des Inscriptions et Belles-Lettres
 Claude Lecouteux, historian
 Jean-Luc Marion, philosopher, member of the Académie française (2008)
 Danièle Pistone, musicologist, correspondent member at the Académie des beaux-arts (2014)
 Frédéric Regard, littérature britannique, spécialiste des études de genre en France
 Jean-Yves Tadié, English Literature
 Jean Tulard, historian, member of the Académie des sciences morales et politiques (1994)

Notable alumni

 Donald Adamson (born 1939), British historian
 Shmuel Agmon (born 1922), Israeli mathematician
 Hamad Bin Abdulaziz Al-Kawari (born  1948), Qatari diplomat
 Sophia Antoniadis (1895-1972), classical scholar and first female professor at Leiden University
 Philippe Barbarin (born 1950), French Catholic Archbishop of Lyon and cardinal
 Charlotte Casiraghi (born 1986), Italian fashion journalist
 Karl P. Cohen (1913–2012), American physical chemist
 Ioan Petru Culianu (1950–1991), Romanian historian
Abiol Lual Deng (born 1983), South Sudanese-American political scientist
 Mamadou Diouf, Senegalese professor of Western African history at Columbia University
 Marie Drucker (born 1974), French journalist
 Soudabeh Fazaeli (born 1947), Iranian seismologist, researcher, mythologist and writer
 Luc Ferry (born 1951), French philosopher
 Henri Guaino (born 1957) French politician
 William Irigoyen (born 1970), French journalist
 Besiana Kadare (born 1972), Albanian Ambassador to the UN
 Samir Kassir (1960–2005), Lebanese-French professor of history at Saint-Joseph University
 Jiddu Krishnamurti (born 1895), Indian philosopher
 Thanh Hai Ngo (born 1947), Vietnamese-Canadian senator
 Caterina Magni (born 1966) Italian-French archaeologist
 Shahrzad Rafati (born 1980), Iranian-Canadian media entrepreneur
 Bernard Romain (born 1944), French painter and sculptor
 Christiane Taubira (born 1952), Minister of Justice of France
 Habib Tawa (born 1945), Lebanese-French historian
 Jean-Pierre Thiollet (born 1956), French writer
 Shunichi Yamaguchi (born 1950), Japanese politician
Nureldin Satti, Sudanese diplomat and ambassador to the United States.
 Jemima West (born 1987), Anglo-French actress
 Baby Varghese Indian scholar and professor
 Abdul Hafeez Mirza (born 1939), Pakistani Tourism worker, cultural activist and Professor of French. Studied International Tourism.

See also
 Sorbonne University, its successor
 University of Paris, its predecessor
 Sorbonne
 Education in France

References

External links
 Official website (French, English)
 Paris-Sorbonne University Abu Dhabi Campus
 Site DIES

 
Educational institutions established in 1971
1971 establishments in France
Educational institutions disestablished in 2017
2017 disestablishments in France
Defunct universities in Paris